Senator Reeves may refer to:

A. Crozer Reeves (1867–1936), New Jersey State Senate
Bryce Reeves (born 1966), Virginia State Senate
Eric Miller Reeves (born 1963), North Carolina State Senate
Shane Reeves (fl. 1990s–2010s), Tennessee State Senate